Thundamentals are an Australian hip hop group originating from the Blue Mountains region bordering the metropolitan area of Sydney. The members are currently Tuka, Jeswon, and Morgs. They have released five studio albums.

History

Band origins: 2008–2010
Before becoming Thundamentals, the band consisted of Morgan Jones, Tommy Fiasko, Jesse Ferris, MC Tuksnatch, MC Ruthless and DJ Clockwork, and was called Connect 4. Today, the group consists of Morgan Jones, Jesse Ferris, Brendan Tuckerman and Kevin Kerr.  In 2009, they released their first album Sleeping On Your Style. DJ Lee Hartney from The Smith Street Band went to one band practice in 2009, but decided to give up his DJ career in favour of playing guitar. In 2010, Thundamentals featured at Festival First Night in Sydney.

In the Triple J Hottest 100, 2012, Thundamentals' Like a Version recording of fellow Australian Matt Corby's "Brother" came in at number 49. The original "Brother" placed number 3 the previous year in Triple J Hottest 100, 2011. In the Triple J Hottest 100, 2014, three of their tracks were voted into the countdown: "Something I Said", "Quit Your Job" and "Got Love". In December 2016 the group announced their new record label, High Depth. they also announced that their fourth studio album, Everyone We Know, would be released in February 2017 as the first release on the label produced by Dave Hammer. Thundamentals' track "Think About It" came in at number 82 on the Triple J Hottest 100, 2016. Their track "Sally" came in at number 8 on the Triple J Hottest 100, 2017.

Discography

Studio albums

Live albums

Extended plays

Singles

Music videos

Guest appearances

Awards and nominations

AIR Awards
The Australian Independent Record Awards (commonly known informally as AIR Awards) is an annual awards night to recognise, promote and celebrate the success of Australia's Independent Music sector.

|-
| AIR Awards of 2014
|So We Can Remember 
| Best Independent Hip Hop/Urban Album
| 
|-

J awards
The J Awards are an annual series of Australian music awards that were established by the Australian Broadcasting Corporation's youth-focused radio station Triple J. They commenced in 2005.

|-
| J Awards of 2013
| "Smiles Don't Lie"
| Australian Video of the Year
| 
|-
| J Awards of 2014
|So We Can Remember
| Australian Album of the Year
| 
|-
| J Awards of 2017
| Everyone We Know
| Australian Album of the Year
| 
|-

References

External links
 

Australian hip hop groups
Obese Records artists